heather ahtone, PhD (Choctaw/Chickasaw Nation), is director of Curatorial Affairs at the First Americans Museum.

Background and education 
heather ahtone is enrolled in the Chickasaw Nation and a descendant of the Choctaw Nation of Oklahoma. She received an associate's degree from the Institute of American Indian Arts (IAIA) in 1993 and her master's degree (2006) and doctoral degree from the University of Oklahoma (OU).

Career 
ahtone previously worked at the IAIA and the Southwestern Association for Indian Arts (SWAIA).

In 2007, she began researching at the OU School of Geology and Geophysics while teaching courses in Art History in Norman, Oklahoma. She served as the James T. Bialac Curator of Native American and Non-Western Art at the Fred Jones Jr. Museum of Art, part of OU, from 2012 to 2018.

She became the senior curator at the First Americans Museum in Oklahoma City, Oklahoma, in 2018. Involved with the museum's planning, ahtone is responsible for creating exhibitions for the museum, managing publications, and coordinating research.

Writing 
ahtone has published in journals such as American Indian Horizons, International Journal of Arts in Society, and Wíčazo Ša Review. She has authored and contributed to catalogues, ‘’OKLA HOMMA’’, ‘’WINIKO: Life of an Object, Selections from the Smithsonian’s National Museum of the American Indian’’, Warhol and the West, Crow's Shadow Institute of the Arts at 25, Hopituy: Hopi Art from the Permanent Collections, From the belly of our being: Art by and about Native Creation, Seeds of Being: A Project of the Andrew W. Mellon Foundation Native American Art & Museum Studies Seminar, and many more.

Awards and honors 
In 2007, Oklahoma Magazine named ahtone a "40 Under 40."

Select exhibitions curated 
 2020: Re/Convening: Native Arts of Oklahoma, Hardesty Arts Center (AHHA), Tulsa, Oklahoma
 2017: Photo/Synthesis with Will Wilson, Fred Jones Jr. Museum of Art 
 2016: From the belly of our being art by and about Native creation, Oklahoma State University Museum of Art, Stillwater, OK
 2015: Enter the Matrix: Indigenous Printmakers, Fred Jones Jr. Museum of Art
 2013: Hopituy: Hopi Art from the Permanent Collection, Fred Jones Jr. Museum of Art
 2012: James T. Bialac Native American Art Collection: Selected Works, Fred Jones Jr. Museum of Art

See also 
 James Pepper Henry

References

External links 
 heather ahtone profile, Chickasaw TV

Year of birth missing (living people)
Living people
Chickasaw people
Chickasaw people of Choctaw descent
Native American academics
Native American curators
Native American writers
People from Norman, Oklahoma
Native American women writers
21st-century Native Americans
21st-century Native American women
American women curators
American curators